The Bird of Washington, Washington Eagle or Great Sea Eagle (Falco washingtonii or Falco washingtoniensis) was a putative species of sea eagle which was claimed in 1826 and published by John James Audubon in his famous work, The Birds of America.  It is now not recognised as a valid species.  Theories about its true nature include:

 that it was a juvenile specimen or sub-species of bald eagle (Haliaeetus leucocephalus)
 that it was an invention and that the picture was plagiarised from a picture of a golden eagle in Rees's Cyclopædia
 that it was actually a genuine species, but it was rare and became extinct after Audubon's sightings

Audobon's painting of the bird was acquired by Sidney Dillon Ripley, and his family donated it to the Smithsonian American Art Museum in 1994.

References

Further reading
Allen, J. A. 1870. What is the ‘Washington Eagle'? The American Naturalist 4: pp 524–527

Audubon, J. J. 1828. Notes on the Bird of Washington (Fálco Washingtoniàna), or Great American Sea Eagle. Magazine of Natural History 1: pp 115–120.

Maruna, S. 2006. Substantiating Audubon's Washington Eagle. Ohio Cardinal 29: pp 140–150. 
Fictional birds

Scientific misconduct